Citharomangelia townsendi is a species of sea snail, a marine gastropod mollusk in the family Mangeliidae.

Description
The length of the shell varies attains 13 mm, its diameter 3.8 mm.

(Original description) The elongate-fusiform shell approaches in form the European Mangelia attenuata (Montagu, 1803), but it is larger, the elongate spire proportionately longer, whilst the whorls are slightly shouldered. The transverse striae are very fine, and the longitudinal ribs regular and rounded. The colour is yellowish white, suffused with greyish green, with transverse lines of light brown, and a dark brown band, interrupted by the ribs, at the angle of the whorls, and another near the base of the body-whorl. The aperture is oblong and very narrow. The outer lip is acute and incrassate.

Distribution
This marine species occurs off Pakistan and West India.

References

External links
 Kilburn R.N. 1992. Turridae (Mollusca: Gastropoda) of southern Africa and Mozambique. Part 6. Subfamily Mangeliinae, section 1. Annals of the Natal Museum, 33: 461–575 
  Tucker, J.K. 2004 Catalog of recent and fossil turrids (Mollusca: Gastropoda). Zootaxa 682:1–1295.
 

townsendi
Gastropods described in 1895